Océane Manon Mathilde Piegad (born 12 August 2003) is a French figure skater who currently competes in pairs.

As a single skater, Piegad is the 2020 French junior national silver medalist and competed at the 2019 European Youth Olympic Winter Festival.

Personal life 
Piegad was born on 12 August 2003 in Nice, France. As of 2022, she is a university student studying physiotherapy.

Programs

With Strekalin

With Belmonte

As a single skater

Competitive highlights

Pairs with Strekalin

Pairs with Belmonte

Women's singles

References

External links 
 

2003 births
Living people
French female single skaters
French female pair skaters
Sportspeople from Nice